Kapelski Vrh is a settlement in the Municipality of Radenci in northeastern Slovenia.

The local parish church is dedicated to Mary Magdalene. It is built on a hill surrounded with vineyards above the settlement and is a popular spot with day-trippers. It was built between 1823 and 1824.

References

External links 
Kapelski Vrh on Geopedia

Populated places in the Municipality of Radenci